Aq Robat is a village in Bamyan Province in northern-central Afghanistan.

See also
Bamyan Province

References

External links
Satellite map at Maplandia.com

Populated places in Bamyan Province